Distributed economies (DE) is a term that was coined by Allan Johansson et al. in 2005.

Definition
There is no official definition for DE, but it could be described as a regional approach to promote innovation by small and medium-sized enterprises, as well as sustainable development. The concept is illustrated in the figure below, that shows centralised, decentralised and distributed economies respectively.

Features
The relations in DE are much more complex than those in a centralised economy. This feature makes the whole economy more stable – leaf nodes no longer rely on just one central node. It also resembles ecological networks, making it a good practical example of industrial ecology.
A big advantage of DE is that it enables entities within the network to work much more with regional/local natural resources, finances, human capital, knowledge, technology, and so on. It also makes the entities more flexible to respond to the local market needs and thus generating a bigger innovation drive. By doing this, they become a better reflection of their social environment and in that way they can improve quality of life.
The whole concept of DE is not at all a new invention – this is how most pre-industrial economies were organised. However, information technology has opened new doors for the concept: information can be shared much more easily and small-scale production facilities (rapid prototyping) are becoming cheaper.
The DE concept works well with the development of fab labs.

Not all industries are fit for DE; for example, many chemical processes only become economically feasible & efficient on a large scale. On the other hand, bio-energy and consumer products are interesting candidates.

See also
Decentralized planning (economics)
Distributism
Long tail
Open-design movement
Slow design

References

External links
 DeLabs - Learning Labs for Distributed Economies
 DE at The International Institute for Industrial Environmental Economics at Lund University, Sweden

Economic systems